Rosabelle Osborne,  (died 8 May 1958) was a British military nurse and nursing administrator. She served as Principal Matron at the War Office in 1924 and as Matron-in-Chief at the Queen Alexandra's Imperial Military Nursing Service (QAIMNS) from 1 April 1928 until 1930.

The second daughter of Dr. J. A. Osborne of Milford, County Donegal, Rosabelle Osborne received her training at the Manchester Children's Hospital, Pendlebury, and Bristol Royal Infirmary. She served with the QAIMNS from May 1903. She was on active service abroad during the First World War in France, Egypt, Malta and Salonika.

External links
 National Portrait Gallery webpage
 QARANC website
 RCN archive (search by name)
 London Gazette

1958 deaths
British Army personnel of World War I
British nursing administrators
British people of Irish descent
Commanders of the Order of the British Empire
Female nurses in World War I
Female wartime nurses
Members of the Royal Red Cross
Place of birth missing
Place of death missing
Queen Alexandra's Royal Army Nursing Corps officers
Year of birth unknown